Bize is the name or part of the name of the following communes in France:

 Bize, Albania, a village in Albania
 Bize, Haute-Marne, in the Haute-Marne department
 Bize, Hautes-Pyrénées, in the Hautes-Pyrénées department
 Bize-Minervois, in the Aude department